The Shire of Pakenham was a local government area about  southeast of Melbourne, the state capital of Victoria, Australia.

History

The Berwick Road District was incorporated on 24 October 1862, and became a shire on 12 May 1868. At the time, it was a considerably larger area, extending well into what is now Melbourne's eastern and southeastern suburbs, including today's City of Knox, as well as areas east of Dandenong and the Dandenong Ranges.

On 23 May 1889, the Scoresby Riding was severed and incorporated as the Shire of Fern Tree Gully. Fern Tree Gully in turn was splintered in 1964, to form the City of Knox and the Shire of Sherbrooke.

In 1902, the Berwick Shire headquarters moved to Pakenham. The shire was generally rural in character, with fruit growing, dairying and sheep and cattle grazing being the main pursuits. However, from the 1950s onward, the western part, around Berwick and Narre Warren, experienced major residential growth as well as industrial development. On 1 October 1973, the western part split from the shire and was immediately proclaimed as the City of Berwick. The remaining rural area was renamed the Shire of Pakenham on 1 September 1974.

On 15 December 1994, the Shire of Pakenham was abolished, and along with parts of the City of Cranbourne (Koo Wee Rup and Lang Lang) and the Shire of Sherbrooke (around Emerald and Cockatoo), was merged into the newly created Shire of Cardinia.

Council met at the Shire Offices, in Duncan Drive, Pakenham. The facility is now the headquarters for the Shire of Cardinia.

Wards

The Shire of Pakenham was divided into four ridings on 1 April 1988, each of which elected three councillors:
 Beacon Hills Ward
 Iona Ward
 Ranges Ward
 Toomuc Ward

Suburbs and localities
Outer Metropolitan:
 Beaconsfield (shared with the City of Berwick)
 Beaconsfield Upper
 Cockatoo
 Emerald (shared with the Shire of Sherbrooke)
 Gembrook
 Officer
 Pakenham*
 Pakenham South
 Pakenham Upper

* Council seat.

Rural:
 Bunyip
 Bunyip North
 Cora Lynn
 Dewhurst
 Garfield
 Iona
 Maryknoll
 Nar Nar Goon
 Nar Nar Goon North
 Tonimbuk
 Tynong
 Vervale

Population

* Estimate in the 1958 Victorian Year Book.
+ Includes 20,474 from Berwick district and 12,636 from Pakenham district.

References

External links
 Victorian Places - Pakenham Shire

Pakenham
1862 establishments in Australia
Shire of Cardinia
1994 disestablishments in Australia